was a Japanese racing driver who competed at the top level of Japanese Formula racing, currently known as Super Formula, between 1976 and 1992. Under the Japanese Formula 2 moniker, he won the championship in 1979 and was runner-up to future Formula 1 driver Satoru Nakajima in 1982 and 1985.

Motorsport career 
Matsumoto scored 11 wins and 29 podium finishes, seventh all-time in both accounts, over a 129-race career, which put him third in all-time Super Formula career starts behind generational peers Kazuyoshi Hoshino and Kunimitsu Takahashi. In a rare overseas foray in 1981, he also took part in the Donington "50.000", a race of the European Formula Two championship, crossing the finish line in 15th place.

Until 1989, he also dabbled in Japanese sports car racing, winning the Fuji Grand Champion Series in 1983, and the Fuji 1000 km in 1985 and 1989. In the 1985 win, Matsumoto, Hoshino, and Akira Hagiwara became the first Japanese drivers to ever win a race in the World Sportscar Championship; Hoshino was actually the only one who got to drive the car before the race was stopped early due to heavy rain. Matsumoto also competed in the 1987 24 Hours of Le Mans alongside Hoshino and Kenji Takahashi as an official Nissan driver.

Matsumoto was the first public face of Cabin Racing, begun by Japan Tobacco in 1986, and his appearance in TV commercials brought him wide public attention. After retiring, he remained active in the Japanese motorsports scene and was a driver coach for Shintaro Kawabata, Ryo Michigami, Shinji Nakano, and Juichi Wakisaka among others.

Personal life and death
Matsumoto was born in Kyoto Prefecture. He died in Kyoto on May 17, 2015 after several years with cirrhosis.

Racing record

Japanese Top Formula Championship results 

(key) (Races in bold indicate pole position) (Races in italics indicate fastest lap)

Complete 24 Hours of Le Mans results

References

1949 births
2015 deaths
Sportspeople from Kyoto Prefecture
Japanese racing drivers
Japanese Formula Two Championship drivers
Japanese Formula 3000 Championship drivers
24 Hours of Le Mans drivers

Grand Champion Series drivers
Team LeMans drivers
Long Distance Series drivers
Japanese Sportscar Championship drivers
Nismo drivers
World Sportscar Championship drivers
TOM'S drivers